The  is a railway line in Hino, Tokyo, Japan, owned by the Keio Corporation, which connects Takahatafudō on the Keiō Main Line and Tama-Dōbutsukōen (for Tama Zoo and the Keio Rail-Land railway amusement park).

It is a single track of  gauge. The line is electrified at 1,500 V DC.

Stations

History
The line opened on 29 April 1964.

"Wanman" one-person operation started in 2000. 

The line experienced a drop in ridership numbers following the closure of the Tama Tech theme park in 2009.

In 2011, operation switched from 6000 series to 7000 series trainsets.

References

Dobutsuen Line
Railway lines in Tokyo
4 ft 6 in gauge railways in Japan
Railway lines opened in 1964